"The Wonderworker" is a religious epithet applied to:

 Hypatius of Gangra (died 326), Eastern Orthodox and Catholic saint and bishop of Gangra in the Byzantine Empire
 John of Shanghai and San Francisco (1896–1966), Eastern Orthodox ascetic and saint
 Leo of Catania (703 or 709–789), Catholic and Eastern Orthodox saint and bishop of Catania
 Saint Memnon, 2nd century Egyptian ascetic and Coptic saint
 Saint Nicholas (270–343), Catholic saint and bishop of Myra
 Peter the Wonderworker, 10th century Byzantine Christian and Eastern Orthodox saint and bishop of Argos and Nauplion
 Saint Spyridon (c. 270–348), saint and bishop of Trimythous from Cyprus
 Theodore of the Jordan, 6th century Eastern Orthodox and Eastern Catholic saint

See also
 Basil Fool for Christ (1468–1552 or 1557), Wonderworker of Moscow, Russian Orthodox saint and holy fool
 Gregory Thaumaturgus (c. 213–270), Catholic and Orthodox saint and bishop, "Thaumaturgus" being translated as "the wonder worker" or "the miracle worker"

Wonderworker